Si Genaro (born 1971) is a British musician who is known for his prolific work in developing younger artists and supporting musicians in their ambitions, more than his appearances on BBC's The Voice UK in 2014 and 2015.

Born in 1971, Genaro grew up on the Isle of Wight, attending Cowes High School. He began his musical career as a harmonica player, busking in Ryde and Cowes. In his 20s he moved to Bournemouth and studied at music college, before going on to front regional bands such as Shapeshifter, Dubheart and The Genaro Project.  In 2009, Genaro supported the UK number one charting pop singer David Essex on a UK tour and in 2012 he joined fellow Bournemouth musician and Voice contestant Ant Henson as vocalist and guitarist of the psychedelic post-rock band, Ever The Animal.

In January 2014, Si Genaro appeared on BBC 1 singing Men at Work's "Down Under" as part of the reality television show The Voice UK. Despite not convincing any of the judges to turn their chairs and thus put him through. In February 2015, Genaro appeared in series 4 of The Voice singing "Falling Slowly". As in 2014, none of the judges selected him for their teams. He performed a rendition of his own song, "When the Last Bird Flies".
In June 2016 his typical energetic and magnetic self supported Luke Concannon at one of his house concert Uk tour dates.  

Si Genaros song "Down Under" is known as one of the most harmonic acts but, he is not acoustic because he has other instruments in his songs.

In 2015 Genaro backed a track called "Burn the Fire" by local artists Simon Harder and Matt Black (Piano Man) with his Harmonica and Guitar by Chris Payne later released by Hangover Hill Recording Studio

References

The Voice UK contestants
Living people
1971 births
People from Cowes